An F-clamp, also known as a bar clamp or speed clamp, is a type of clamp. The name comes from its "F" shape. The F-clamp is similar to a C-clamp in use, but has a wider opening capacity (throat). This tool is used in woodworking while more permanent attachment is being made with screws or glue, or in metalworking to hold pieces together for welding or bolting.

An F-clamp consists of two horizontal bars joined together by a vertical bar. There is a large screw on the lower bar to allow for the clamp to be tightened.  F-clamps are adjustable which allows for them to be used on larger scale objects without the need for a large screw.

An F-clamp is also a simple mechanical device used for lifting engine or transmission parts. The clamp has an adjusting screw to tighten onto the part and a lifting ring to attach a hoist cable.

F-clamps in the industry terminology have the jaws mounted on a flat bar, while a pipe clamp, which has the same construction, is mounted on a pipe, normally of 1/2" or 3/4" diameter.

References

External links
 For diameter analysis
 Clamp history

Clamps (tool)
Metalworking hand tools
Woodworking hand tools